Gustav Harry Jansson (also known as Harry Jangneus, June 4, 1916 – March 11, 2002) was a Swedish speed skater who competed in the 1948 Winter Olympics.

In 1948 he finished fourth in the 5000 metres competition, fifth in the 1500 metres event, and eighth in the 10000 metres competition.

External links
 Speed skating 1948  

1916 births
2002 deaths
Swedish male speed skaters
Olympic speed skaters of Sweden
Speed skaters at the 1948 Winter Olympics
20th-century Swedish people